White Cat may refer to:

Deaf white cat, domestic cats with a pure white coat who suffer from congenital deafness 
The White Cat (fairy tale), French fairy tale by Madame d'Aulnoy
White Cat (book), 2010 book by Holly Black
Black Cat, White Cat, 1998 Yugoslav romantic comedy film
White Cat Black Cat, Hong Kong children's comic book series
The White Cat (film), a 1950 Swedish drama film directed by Hasse Ekman
Victoria the White Cat, a character from the 1981 musical Cats
Ora White Cat, a battery electric city car